Nigilgia is a genus of moths in the family Brachodidae.

Species
Nigilgia adjectella Walker, 1863 (Australia)
Nigilgia albitogata (Walsingham, 1891)
Nigilgia anactis Diakonoff, 1982 (Sri Lanka)
Nigilgia atribractea Kallies, 2013
Nigilgia aureoviridis Kallies, 1998 (Sulawesi)
Nigilgia browni Kallies, 2013
Nigilgia cuprea Kallies, 1998 (northern Borneo)
Nigilgia diehli Kallies, 2000 (Sumatra)
Nigilgia eucallynta (Meyrick, 1937)
Nigilgia limata Diakonoff & Arita, 1979 (Ryukyu Islands, Taiwan)
Nigilgia mochlophanes (Meyrick, 1921)
Nigilgia pseliota (Meyrick, 1920)
Nigilgia seyrigella (Viette, 1954) (Madagascar)
Nigilgia superbella (Rebel, 1907) (Yemen, Saudi Arabia, United Arab Emirates)
Nigilgia talhouki Diakonoff, 1984 (Saudi Arabia)
Nigilgia toulgoëtella (Viette, 1954) (Madagascar)
Nigilgia venerea (Meyrick, 1921) (Java, Sumatra, Sulawesi, northern Borneo) (syn: Nigilgia nagaii Arita, 1987)
Nigilgia violacea Kallies & Arita, 2007

References

Brachodidae